Judith Ellen Light (born February 9, 1949) is an American actress. She made her professional stage debut in 1970, before making her Broadway debut in the 1975 revival of A Doll's House. Her breakthrough role was in the ABC daytime soap opera One Life to Live from 1977 to 1983, where she played the role of Karen Wolek; for this role, she won two consecutive Daytime Emmy Awards for Outstanding Lead Actress in a Drama Series. Light starred as Angela Bower in the long-running ABC sitcom Who's the Boss? from 1984 to 1992.

Light played the recurring role of Elizabeth Donnelly in the NBC legal crime drama Law & Order: Special Victims Unit (2002–2010) and also played Claire Meade in the ABC comedy-drama Ugly Betty (2006–2010), for which she was nominated for a Primetime Emmy Award in 2007. From 2013 to 2014, she played the role of villainous Judith Brown Ryland in the TNT drama series, Dallas. In 2014, she began starring as Shelly Pfefferman in the critically acclaimed Amazon Studios dark comedy-drama series Transparent, for which she received several Golden Globe, Primetime Emmy, and Critics' Choice Award nominations. She again received Primetime Emmy and Critics' Choice Award nominations for playing Marilyn Miglin in The Assassination of Gianni Versace: American Crime Story in 2018. In 2019, she was awarded a star on the Hollywood Walk of Fame.

Light received her first nomination for a Tony Award in 2011, for her performance in the original Broadway play Lombardi. In 2012 and 2013, she won two consecutive Tony Awards for Best Featured Actress in a Play, for her performances in Other Desert Cities and The Assembled Parties. Light is a prominent LGBTQ+ and HIV/AIDS activist. Her advocacy work began in the early 1980s, in the early days of the HIV/AIDS epidemic.

Early life
Light was born to a Jewish family in Trenton, New Jersey. She is the daughter of Pearl Sue (née Hollander), a model, and Sidney Licht, an accountant. Licht graduated from high school in 1966 at St. Mary's Hall–Doane Academy in Burlington, New Jersey.
She graduated from Carnegie Mellon University with a degree in drama. She recalled graduating with a class of 15 actors who were there all four years. She said "it was a really rigorous program and I thank God for it because it was an amazing training program." She made her professional debut on stage in Richard III at the California Shakespeare Festival in 1970.

Career

Early work and breakthrough
Light made her Broadway debut in A Doll's House in 1975. She also starred in the 1976 Broadway play Herzl. Light also acted for such theatre companies as the Milwaukee Repertory Theater and the Seattle Repertory Theatre. In the late 1970s, Light went through a real crisis after a period of not landing any parts. Broke, she almost quit acting, because she felt that she was not contributing to the theater.

In 1977, her agent phoned Light to have her audition for an understudy role in the ABC soap opera One Life to Live. Not wanting to be attached to a soap opera or a sitcom she initially rejected the idea, until she was told her daily salary would be $350. At the audition she realized that "the format reaches a lot of people". She could "make a difference" and "make money" at the same time. Instead of landing an understudy role, she was recast in the role of Karen Wolek, a role that had previously been portrayed by actresses Kathryn Breech and Julia Duffy. This role was quite lucrative for Light and spawned one of the show's most-remembered storylines; Light's character became an alcoholic prostitute after she became bored with her life as a housewife. On trial, Karen saved her friend Viki Lord Riley (Erika Slezak) from being convicted of killing Karen's pimp, Marco Dane (Gerald Anthony) by admitting to the entire town, including her faithful husband, Dr Larry Wolek (Michael Storm), that she had been a prostitute.

Light's portrayal of Karen brought the show critical acclaim and is credited with garnering One Life to Live ratings successes from the late 1970s into the early 1980s. Light's dramatic, confessional courtroom performance of a housewife-turned-prostitute on the witness stand is regarded as one of the most memorable moments in television by TV Guide. In 1980, this won Light her first Daytime Emmy Award for "Lead Actress in a Daytime Drama Series"; the scene in which she confessed her guilt in court is held in such high esteem that it is used in acting classes to the current day. Light recalled: "I was scared before those courtroom scenes. I was afraid to put myself out that much. With the agony of pulling it out piece by piece and having the prosecutor stick the knife in her gut, I couldn't help but let everything spew out of her." Light won another Emmy in the role in 1981.

She appeared in an episode of St. Elsewhere in its first season, called "Dog Day Hospital", in which she played a housewife who became pregnant for the ninth time even though her husband claimed he had had a vasectomy. In an effort to punish the doctor who botched the job she took an operating room hostage though it was later revealed that her husband had not had the procedure.

Continued success and film expansion 
After her success on daytime television Light landed the leading role of assertive advertising executive Angela Bower on the ABC sitcom Who's the Boss?. Co-starring Tony Danza, who played her housekeeper (and eventual boyfriend), the show ran for eight seasons from 1984 to 1992. The series was successful in the ratings, consistently ranked in the top ten in the final primetime ratings between the years of 1985 and 1989, and has since continued in syndication. TV Guide ranked Who's the Boss? as the 109th best sitcom of all time. Along with her work in Who's the Boss?, she starred in several television films, including Stamp of a Killer (1987) alongside Jimmy Smits; and the critically acclaimed biographical drama The Ryan White Story (1989), in which she played the mother of HIV/AIDS positive teenager Ryan White. 
Light appeared in Wife, Mother, Murderer (1991), in which she played Audrey Marie Hilley. After Who's the Boss?, Light starred in another ABC sitcom, Phenom, which ran for one season, 1993–94, before being canceled. In 1998 she starred in another short-lived sitcom, The Simple Life on CBS. She spent most of the 1990s starring in made-for-TV and feature films including Men Don't Tell and 1997's Too Close to Home, which co-starred Ricky Schroder. In 1999, Light returned to the stage in the off-Broadway production of Pulitzer Prize-winning play Wit. She earned strong reviews for her portrayal of Vivian Bearing, a university professor battling ovarian cancer, and reprised the role for the national tour. Light shaved her head for the role in the play.

Light returned to television with the recurring role of Judge Elizabeth Donnelly in the NBC legal crime drama Law & Order: Special Victims Unit in 2002. She appeared in 25 episodes of the series from 2002 to 2010. In 2004 she starred in another short-lived CBS sitcom, The Stones. In 2006, Light joined the cast of the ABC comedy-drama series Ugly Betty as Claire Meade, the mother of Alexis and Daniel. She was a recurring guest-star during the first season and was promoted to series regular as of the second. Light appeared in the show until the series finale in 2010. She was nominated for the Primetime Emmy Award for Outstanding Guest Actress in a Comedy Series in 2007, and for the Screen Actors Guild Award for Outstanding Performance by an Ensemble in a Comedy Series in 2008, for her performance in show.

Light appeared in a number of films in the 2000s. She co-starred opposite Chris Messina and Jennifer Westfeldt in the 2006 romantic comedy film Ira & Abby. In 2007, Light starred as a radical Christian woman in the independent film Save Me. Light's character, Gayle, runs a Christian ministry known as Genesis House, which works to help gay men recover from their 'affliction.' She is challenged by the arrival of Mark, an ill gay man who reminds Gayle of her dead, homosexual son, and the movie chronicles the challenges of the two as they learn to accept each other as they are.

Acclaim in theater and return to television 
From 2010 to 2011, Light appeared on Broadway as witty alcoholic Marie Lombardi in the play Lombardi, for which she received a nomination for the Tony Award, for Best Performance by an Actress in a Featured Role in a Play. Another role on Broadway followed, as Silda Grauman in Other Desert Cities from 2011 to 2012, which garnered Light her first Tony Award for Featured Actress in a Play and the 2012 Drama Desk Award for Outstanding Featured Actress in a Play. Light also starred in two television pilots, ABC's sitcom Other People's Kids and USA Network's drama Eden, both in 2011 and neither of which were green-lit to continue. 

Light appeared on Broadway as Faye in the 2013 play, The Assembled Parties, and won her second Tony Award for Featured Actress in a Play for her performance. In the same year, she joined the cast of TNT's continuation of the television series Dallas, in the role of Judith Brown Ryland, villainous mother of Harris Ryland (despite being only three years older than Mitch Pileggi who plays her TV son). She received positive reviews for her recurring role in Dallas, with Entertainment Weekly naming her the "scene-stealer" of the series. 

In 2014, she was cast opposite Jeffrey Tambor in the critically acclaimed Amazon Studios dark comedy-drama series, Transparent created by Jill Soloway. She plays Shelly Pfefferman, ex-wife of the transgender character played by Tambor. The pilot episode debuted on February 6, 2014, and later episodes premiered on September 26, 2014. Light received Critics' Choice Television Award for Best Supporting Actress in a Comedy Series and Golden Globe Award for Best Supporting Actress – Series, Miniseries or Television Film nominations for her performance.

Light appeared opposite Patricia Clarkson in the 2014 rom-com, Last Weekend, and as the mother of Melanie Lynskey's character in a comedy-drama film, We'll Never Have Paris, the same year. She returned to Broadway in 2015 as Madame Raquin in Helen Edmundson's adaptation of Thérèse Raquin, starring opposite Keira Knightley and Matt Ryan. In 2017, Light was featured in the American Theatre Wing's Working in the Theatre series on solo performance. 

Light received critical acclaim for her portrayal of Marilyn Miglin in 2018's The Assassination of Gianni Versace: American Crime Story, a mini-series on FX, culminating in a Primetime Emmy nomination for Outstanding Supporting Actress in a Limited Series or Movie. In 2019, Light guest-starred in the Netflix series, The Politician. Together with Bette Midler, she joined the main cast of the series for the second season, which premiered in June 2020. She received a star on the Hollywood Walk of Fame on September 12, 2019.

In 2021, Light played Rosa Stevens in the biographical musical drama film Tick, Tick... Boom! directed by Lin-Manuel Miranda. She later starred in the comedy-thriller The Menu. She also was cast in the comedy-drama Down Low, and comedy-drama The Young Wife starring Kiersey Clemons. On television, Light played Courteney Cox's mother in the Starz horror comedy series Shining Vale, and Blanche Knopf in the HBO Max series Julia, both having premiered in 2022.

Personal life
Light has been married to television actor Robert Desiderio since 1985. The couple live apart: she lives in New York City, and he resides in Southern California. She has a home in Beverly Hills, California and a home in Aspen, Colorado. She is Jewish and considers herself religious, without being attached to institutional religion. She has practiced Kundalini yoga for 20 years.

Activism 
After being inspired by the LGBTQ+ community, Light began advocating for people diagnosed with HIV/AIDS in the early 1980s. She was one of the first celebrities to advocate against the social stigma encountered by LGBTQ+ people and those with AIDS. She has served on the boards of the Matthew Shepard Foundation and the Point Foundation, a support organization for students discriminated against based on sexual orientation or gender.

Through her role in Transparent as the ex-wife of a transgender person, Light raises these issues to a broad audience. She reported "It's something that we really haven't talked about before in pop culture, we haven't talked about transgender issues, we haven't talked about mature people's sexuality."

In an interview with the magazine Out, Light stated:“It was the LGBTQ community that inspired me to be the kind of person I wanted to be. I wanted to be authentic and courageous, and for so long I wasn't. When I began doing a lot of advocacy work in the early '80s for HIV and AIDS, I saw the community and the way the community was operating against all odds, against a world and a culture and country that gave them nothing and denigrated them. ... I looked at this community and said, 'This is breathtaking. This is the kind of world and people I want to be around. These are the kind of people I want to be working with."In 2018, Light discussed the similarities between the beginnings of the LGBT rights movement and the Me Too movement.

In addition to LGBT and AIDS activism, she has spoken publicly to encourage vaccination against the flu as a way to protect vulnerable populations.

Filmography

Film

Television films

Television series

Theatre

Awards and nominations

Film and television

Theatre

References

External links

1949 births
Living people
20th-century American actresses
21st-century American actresses
Jewish American actresses
American film actresses
American stage actresses
American television actresses
American soap opera actresses
Doane Academy alumni
Drama Desk Award winners
Tony Award winners
Daytime Emmy Award winners
Daytime Emmy Award for Outstanding Lead Actress in a Drama Series winners
Carnegie Mellon University College of Fine Arts alumni
Actresses from California
Actresses from New Jersey
People from Greater Los Angeles
Actors from Trenton, New Jersey
American LGBT rights activists
HIV/AIDS activists